The 2006–07 Big Ten Conference men's basketball season began with the 2006–07 NCAA Division I men's basketball season in November. The season marked the 102nd season of Big Ten play. Ohio State won the Big Ten Conference regular season championship by two games over Wisconsin. Wisconsin's Alando Tucker was named Big Ten Player of the Year.

Ohio State also won the Big Ten tournament by defeating Wisconsin. As a result of the win, Ohio State received the conference's automatic bid to the 2007 NCAA Men's Division I Basketball Tournament. Six Big Ten teams (Illinois, Indiana, Michigan State, Ohio State, Purdue, and Wisconsin) were invited to the NCAA tournament. Ohio State advanced to the National Championship game before losing to Florida.

Michigan received a bid to the National Invitation Tournament and lost in the second round.

Preconference schedules

Tournaments

ACC–Big Ten Challenge

Regular season

Rankings 

 AP does not release a post-tournament poll.

Conference honors
Two sets of conference award winners are recognized by the Big Ten – one selected by league coaches and one selected by the media.

Postseason

Big Ten tournament

Bracket

NCAA tournament

NIT

2007 NBA Draft

The following Big Ten players were selected in the 2007 NBA Draft:

References